Moez Ben Abdelkader Fezzani may refer to:
 Adel Ben Mabrouk, an individual formerly held in Guantanamo
 Moez Bin Abdul Qadir Fezzani (Bagram detainee), an individual formerly held in Bagram, who has been confused with the similarly named individual held in Guantanamo